Pigeon Street is a cutout animated children's television  series, written by Michael Cole, originally shown on the BBC in 1981 as part of its 'See-Saw' strand for preschoolers.  There were two series with eight and five episodes respectively, each programme lasting 15 minutes. The series was repeated a number of times until 1994.

The animation was created by Alan Rogers and Peter Lang of the Cut-Out Animation Co., who later went on to do a nursery rhyme series with similar animation called Rub-A-Dub-Dub. Voices were performed by George Layton, with additional voices by John Telfer. Music was by Benni Lees, and played by Soulyard.

The shows featured the everyday adventures of a group of characters living on Pigeon Street, an area of flats and terraced housing in a British city, also home to several pigeons which appeared in each show but only occasionally featured in the plot. Characters included Clara the long distance lorry driver, her husband Hugo the chef, Mr Baskerville the detective, Mr Jupiter the astronomer, Mr Macadoo the petshop owner, and twins Molly and Polly, who were only distinguishable by the letter M and P on their jumpers.

Episode listing

Characters
Betty Cox: The school dinner lady and is William's wife and Jim's mother.
Bob Breadsnapper: The owner of the cycle shop called "Bob's Bikes" and is Reg's brother and Doreen's brother-in-law.
Clara Naughton: The lorry driver and is Hugo's wife.
Daisy Waldron: The old lady who is a next-door neighbor to Rose and feeds the pigeons on her window sill.
Doreen Breadsnapper: The owner of the launderette and is Reg's wife and Bob's sister-in-law.
Dr John Glossop: The doctor and is Fiona's husband and Gerald, Molly and Polly's father.
Fiona Glossop: The owner who made strawberry jam and is Gerald, Molly and Polly's mother and the wife of John. 
Flash: Mr Jupiter's dog.
Gerald Glossop: Molly and Polly's older brother and son of John and Fiona.
Hugo Naughton: The local chef and is Clara's husband.
Jim Cox: William and Betty's son.
Molly Glossop: Gerald's sister, Polly's twin sister and twin daughter of John and Fiona.
Mr Baskerville: The detective is always carrying his magnifying glass and has a dog called Watson.
Mr Jupiter: The astronomer is always carrying his telescope and has a dog called Flash.
Mr Macadoo: The pet shop owner.
Polly Glossop: Gerald's other sister, Molly's twin sister and other twin daughter of John and Fiona.
Reg Breadsnapper: The park sweeper and is Doreen's husband and Bob's brother.
Rose Fogg: The other old lady who is another next door neighbour to Daisy and scares the pigeons away.
Tom: Mr Macadoo's cat.
Watson: Mr Baskerville's dog.
William Cox: The window cleaner and is Betty's husband and Jim's father.

Rogers and Lang went on to create many animations for programmes like Words and Pictures, Numbertime, Rosie and Jim, Hotch Potch House, Rat-A-Tat-Tat and The Number Crew.

Credits 
Written by: Michael Cole
With the Voices of: George Layton, John Telfer
Music Composed by: Benni Lees
And Played by: Soulyard
Sound by: André Jaquemin, Peter Hodges, Rod Guest
Edited by: Grahame Scoular, John McNelly, Alec Jeakins
Animation by: Peter Lang
Design by: Alan Rogers
Production by: David Yates, Alan Rogers
A David Yates Production
© BBC MCMLXXXI

Potential reboot

In 2017, plans were announced for a potential reboot of the show.

References

External links
PigeonStreet.com
cut-out.co.uk
Pigeon Street Fan Club on Facebook

1981 British television series debuts
1981 British television series endings
1980s British children's television series
BBC children's television shows
1980s British animated television series
Fictional Columbidae
British stop-motion animated television series
English-language television shows